The Clothing, Laundry and Allied Workers Union of Aotearoa (CLAW) was a trade union in New Zealand. It had a membership of 750, and was affiliated with the New Zealand Council of Trade Unions. In 2007 it merged with the National Distribution Union

References

New Zealand Council of Trade Unions
Trade unions in New Zealand
Textile and clothing trade unions